James Browning Allen (December 28, 1912June 1, 1978) was an American Democratic politician serving as U.S. senator representing Alabama. Allen previously served as the Lieutenant Governor of Alabama and also served in the Alabama Senate and the Alabama House of Representatives.

Allen was succeeded in the US Senate by his wife, Maryon Pittman Allen.

Life and career
The Gadsden native attended the University of Alabama and the University of Alabama School of Law, both located in Tuscaloosa. At the University of Alabama he was a member of Alpha Sigma Phi. He practiced law in Gadsden from 1935 to 1968 and was a member of the Alabama House of Representatives from 1938 to 1942. He resigned from the state legislature to enter active duty in the United States Naval Reserve from 1943 to 1946. He again ran for office after World War II and was a member of the Alabama Senate from 1946 to 1950. He was the 17th and 20th Lieutenant Governor of Alabama from 1951 to 1955 and again from 1963 to 1967.

In 1968, James Allen was elected to succeed the retiring Democratic U.S. Senator J. Lister Hill of Montgomery. Allen won 638,774 (76 percent) to 201,227 (24 percent) for his Republican opponent, Perry O. Hooper, Sr.

Allen was known as one of the most conservative Democrats in the chamber. He was considerably more conservative even than many Republicans of the time. He was an active opponent of the Panama Canal Treaty of 1978. James Allen received one vote for the Republican vice-presidential nomination at the 1976 Republican National Convention.

In March 1974, Allen stated that Governor George Wallace would run in the 1976 Democratic primary and that he believed the Wallace campaign would seek to prevent a repeat of the previous election cycle where the popular vote was not translated into his support from delegates.

Like his Republican Senate colleague, Jesse Helms of North Carolina, Allen was a master of parliamentary procedure. He was considered to have revived the filibuster rule during his nearly ten years as a senator.  Following the 1974 midterm elections,  Allen pledged to use filibusters against liberal officeholders in favor of large spending in the upcoming 94th United States Congress, reasoning that some of the newly elected Democrats could favor larger spending than the members they had replaced: "I don't feel the voters have given any mandate toward increased expenditures. The people's wishes as indicated by the vote are for us to curtail unnecessary programs and cut Federal spending." It was thought at this time that James Allen "could emerge as a leader of the Senate's conservative bloc with the retirement of Senator Sam J. Ervin, Democrat of North Carolina, and the aging of other conservatives".

In December 1974, James Allen led a group of senators in an anti-busing filibuster against the removal of an amendment previously passed in the House of Representatives designed to curb Government enforcement of desegregation orders. The filibuster ended with a two–thirds majority voting 56 to 27 to end debate on language revising the amendment, marking only the 19th time a filibuster was ended in such a manner in Senate history. James Allen stated that the closure move would result in a legislative delay, Hugh Scott replying, "The supplemental is being delayed by the opposition of the Senator from Alabama to the Scott-Mansfield amendment."

James Allen served in the Senate until his death of a heart attack on June 1, 1978, at the resort community of Gulf Shores, Alabama. He is interred at Forrest Cemetery in Gadsden. Governor George C. Wallace, under whom James Allen served previously as lieutenant governor, appointed Allen's widow, Maryon Pittman Allen, to succeed him in the Senate.

See also 

 List of United States Congress members who died in office (1950–99)

References

External links

1912 births
1978 deaths
Alabama lawyers
American members of the Churches of Christ
Democratic Party United States senators from Alabama
Lieutenant Governors of Alabama
Democratic Party Alabama state senators
Democratic Party members of the Alabama House of Representatives
University of Alabama alumni
University of Alabama School of Law alumni
United States Navy sailors
United States Navy personnel of World War II
Politicians from Gadsden, Alabama
People from Gulf Shores, Alabama
20th-century American lawyers
20th-century American politicians